The Women's Hockey Asia Cup is a women's international field hockey tournament organized by the Asian Hockey Federation. The winning team becomes the champion of Asia and qualifies for the FIH Hockey World Cup.

Japan are the defending champions winning the 2022 edition. South Korea and Japan  have won the most titles with 3.

The hosts together with six highest-ranked teams from the previous edition are qualified directly for the tournament, they are joined by the top team from the Women's AHF Cup or the top two teams if the host is already qualified.

Results

Summary

* = hosts

Team appearances

Debut of teams

See also
Field hockey at the Asian Games
Men's Hockey Asia Cup
Women's AHF Cup
Women's Asian Champions Trophy
Women's Hockey Junior Asia Cup
Women's Indoor Hockey Asia Cup

References

External links
Asian Hockey Federation
 todor66.com archive

 
Asia Cup
Field hockey
Hockey Asia Cup